Thomas Edward O'Brien (December 19, 1918 – November 5, 1978) was an outfielder/third baseman in Major League Baseball, playing mainly as a right fielder for three different teams between the   and  seasons. O'Brien batted and threw right-handed. He was born in Anniston, Alabama.

Basically a line-drive hitter and a good fielding replacement, O'Brien entered the majors in 1943 with the Pittsburgh Pirates, playing for them three years before joining the Boston Red Sox (1949–1950) and Washington Senators (1950). His most productive season came in his rookie year, when he posted career-highs in batting average (.310), runs (35), extrabases (21), RBI (26) and games played (89).

In a five-season career, O'Brien was a .277 hitter (198-for-714) with eight home runs and 78 RBI in 293 games, including 110 runs, 30 doubles, 14 triples, two stolen bases, and a .344 on-base percentage.

O'Brien died in Anniston at the age of 59.

External links

Retrosheet

1918 births
1978 deaths
Anniston Rams players
Atlanta Crackers players
Baseball players from Alabama
Birmingham Barons players
Boston Red Sox players
Hollywood Stars players
Louisville Colonels (minor league) players
Major League Baseball outfielders
Minor league baseball managers
Pittsburgh Pirates players
Rochester Red Wings players
Savannah Indians players
Sportspeople from Anniston, Alabama
Washington Senators (1901–1960) players